Virgo is a genus of moths of the family Noctuidae.

Species
 Virgo datanidia Butler, 1885

References
Virgo at funet

Hadeninae